Results from football in Norway in the year 1914.

Class A of local association leagues
Class A of local association leagues (kretsserier) is the predecessor of a national league competition. The champions qualify for the 1914 Norwegian Cup.

Norwegian Cup

First round

|colspan="3" style="background-color:#97DEFF"|5 September 1914

The rest of the teams had a walkover.

Second round

|colspan="3" style="background-color:#97DEFF"|12 September 1914

|-
|colspan="3" style="background-color:#97DEFF"|27 September 1914

Semi-finals

|colspan="3" style="background-color:#97DEFF"|4 October 1914

Final

National team

Sources:

References

External links
RSSSF Football Archive

 
Seasons in Norwegian football